Şehzade Ali Vâsib Efendi (also Ali Vasib Osmanoğlu; 13 October 1903 – 9 December 1983) was an Ottoman prince. From 1977 to his death in 1983, he was the 41st head of the Imperial House of Osman, the Ottoman royal dynasty.

Early life
Vâsib was born on 13 October 1903 in Çırağan Palace, one year before their ordeal in the Çırağan came to an end in 1904. His father was Ahmed Nihad, only son of Şehzade Mehmed Selaheddin and Naziknaz Hanm. His mother was Safiru Hanım. Ali Vasib was very attached to Şayan Kadın, his paternal grandfather's third consort, who chose to stay at Çırağan Palace even after Murad's death. Vasib called her "third grandmother" and often went to see her.

Vasib was educated at the Galatasaray and Harbiye Colleges in Istanbul. He attained the rank of Lieutenant in the Ottoman army infantry. He achieved the "Collar of the Hanedan-ı-Ali-Osman" and the "Mecidi Nişan", 1st Class.

Marriage
On 30 November 1931, Vâsib married his half second cousin once removed Mukbile Sultan at the Ruhl Hotel in Nice, France, the only daughter of Şehzade Ömer Hilmi. Mukbile was the granddaughter of Sultan Mehmed V (half-brother of Sultan Murad V, great-grandfather of Vasib). The couple had one son, Şehzade Osman Selaheddin Vâsib Osmanoğlu, born on 7 July 1940), a chartered accountant. He married Athena Joy Christoforides; they have three sons and one daughter and grandchildren.

Exile
After the formation of the Republic of Turkey in 1923 and the abolition of the Ottoman Sultanate and the Caliphate in the following year, Vasib and other members of his family were forced into exile. They left Istanbul from Sirkeci railway station. Vasib lived in Budapest for a few months, before settling in Nice, France. Other family members moved to the South of France and to Italy, including Vahideddin, (Mehmed VI) who went to San Remo; and Abdulmecid, (Vasib's cousin and the last Caliph) to Nice, after a short time in Switzerland.

French passports
The travel documents issued by the Turkish Republic to the members of the House of Osman on their exile were valid for only one year. Vasib intervened with the French government to obtain passports for them. Vasib made contact with the French minister, Count Castellane through General Toulouse and his son, Captain Toulouse, who was a friend. The French passports listed the family as having Ottoman nationality and acknowledged their imperial titles.

Alexandria
In January 1935, Vasib moved to Alexandria, Egypt with his wife and her family. For the next 18 years, Vasib was the Director of the Antoniadis Palace, which served to accommodate foreign heads of state and dignitaries visiting Alexandria.

Later years

Vasib was permitted to return to Turkey in 1974. From that time, he visited annually and his wife lived in a humble rented flat in the old part of the city near Sultan Ahmed Square. Vasib's memoirs have been published in Turkish. Vasib's son, Osman Selaheddin, transcribed the work from Ottoman Turkish script to present-day Turkish script.

Succession
On 19 January 1977, following the death of his cousin, Şehzade Mehmed Abdulaziz, Vasib became head of the House of Osman. Had Vâsib become the reigning sultan, he would have been "Sultan Ali I".

Death
On 9 December 1983, in Alexandria, Vasib died from a stroke. He was 80. He was buried in Alexandria and later his remains were moved to Sultan Mehmed V Reşad Mausoleum, Eyüp. At the time of his death, he was the oldest living Ottoman prince. On his death, the Monarchist League wrote: "Prince Ali Vasib will be remembered as a man of great charm. His ease of manner and his gifts as a raconteur were the hallmarks of one of the last of the grands seigneurs of the Gotha."

Issue
By his wife, Şehzade Ali Vasib had a only son: 
Şehzade Osman Selaheddin Vasib Osmanoğlu (b. 7 July 1940). Married to Athena Joy Christophorides, they have three sons and one daughter:
Ayşe Gülnev Sultan Osmanoğlu (b. 17 January 1971, England). She is an authress of historical novels about Ottoman dynasty, like The Gilted Cage on the Bosphorus. She married Nicholas Sutton on 27 August 1994 and has three children:
Sultanzade Max Ali Sutton (b. 5 January 2000, London)
Sultanzade Cosmo Tarik Sutton (b. 10 September 2001, London)
Sultanzade Lysander Gengiz Sutton (b. 12 April 2003, London)
Şehzade Orhan Murad Osmanoğlu (b. 26 December 1972, England). He married Patricia Emine Iotti on 18 February 2001. They have two sons:
Şehzade Turan Cem Osmanoğlu (b. 7 January 2004, England)
 Şehzade Tamer Nihad Osmanoğlu (n. 2006)
Şehzade Nihad Reşad Osmanoğlu (b. 17 September 1978 - 19 December 1978, England).
Şehzade Selim Süleyman Osmanoğlu (b. 15 December 1979). On 22 June 2003 in Istanbul he married Alev Öcal. They had a son:
 Şehzade Batu Bayezid Osmanoğlu (n. 2008)

Ancestry

See also
 Line of succession to the former Ottoman throne

References

External links
 Heirs of Europe, Turkey. Retrieved 2019-06-09.

1903 births
1983 deaths
People from Beşiktaş
Heads of the Osmanoğlu family